Club Atlético Huracán (usually Huracán de Tres Arroyos) is an Argentine football club based in the city of Tres Arroyos, in Buenos Aires Province.

The club is the biggest of Tres Arroyos City, and one of the largest in Southern Buenos Aires Province

The club were founded 3 January 1923 and plays in the Torneo Federal C which is the fifth division of the Argentine league.

They played in the first division during the 2004–2005 season. For 2007/2008, the club had to play in the Argentino A because they got relegated during the previous season.

Current squad

Titles
Torneo Argentino A: 1
2000-01

See also

List of football clubs in Argentina
Argentine football league system

References

External links
Official Site 
Huracán Website 
Los Pibes del Puente 
Huracán de Tres Arroyos Website 
Historical T-shirt of Huracán de 3 Arroyos 

 
Football clubs in Buenos Aires Province
Association football clubs established in 1923
1923 establishments in Argentina